is a passenger railway station located in Nishi-ku, Sakai, Osaka Prefecture, Japan, operated by the private railway operator Nankai Electric Railway. It has the station number "NK14".

Lines

Layout
The station consists of two opposed side platforms. The platforms are not interconnected, and passengers wishing to change platforms must exit the station, cross via a level crossing, and re-enter the station.

Platforms

Adjacent stations

History
It was renamed it its present name on 1 December 1908.

Passenger statistics
In fiscal 2019, the station was used by an average of 7749 passengers daily.

Surrounding area
 Suwa no Morimoto Shopping Street.
 Suwa Shrine
Sakai City Hamadera Elementary School
Sakai City Hamaderahigashi Elementary School
Senshu School of Nursing

See also
 List of railway stations in Japan

References

External links

  

Railway stations in Japan opened in 1907
Railway stations in Osaka Prefecture
Sakai, Osaka